The list of ship commissionings in 1956 includes a chronological list of all ships commissioned in 1956.

See also 

1956
 Ship commissionings